Rowland Springs is an unincorporated community in Bartow County, Georgia, United States. It is located approximately five miles east of Cartersville with approximately ten subdivisions and churches, including Rowland Springs Baptist Church. It is situated off Rowland Springs Road and off Georgia State Route 20.

The community was named for John S. Rowland, who established a mineral spa at this site in the 1840s.

References

Unincorporated communities in Bartow County, Georgia
Unincorporated communities in Georgia (U.S. state)